A funhouse or fun house is an amusement facility found on amusement parks and funfair midways equipped with various devices designed to surprise, challenge, and amuse visitors. Unlike thrill rides or dark rides, funhouses are participatory attractions, where visitors enter and move around at their own preference. Incorporating aspects of a playful obstacle course, they seek to distort conventional perceptions and startle people with unpredictable physical circumstances in an ambiance of wacky whimsicality.

Common features

Started originally in the early 1900s, at Coney Island, the funhouse was initially a house/large building containing a number of amusement devices, such as: motorized versions of what can be found on a children's playground.

The most common were:

Slides - Usually much taller and steeper than those on playgrounds. Some were as much as two stories high. Slides of comparable size can be seen today on carnivals as separate attractions. Most were made of polished hardwood and riders sat on burlap mats to protect themselves from friction burns and to prevent rubber-soled shoes from slowing the slider down.
Spinning disks - While the disk was stationary, patrons would sat in its center. As the operator started to spin the disk, people were thrown off by inertia and would end up against a padded wall. A variation was a disk with a raised center, shaped much like a Bundt cake mold; as the device sped up, people slid downhill and outward.
A horizontal revolving cylinder or barrel, sometimes called "barrel of love" or "barrel of fun", to try to walk through without falling down
Floor tricks where sections of floor swung up and down, tip from side to side or move forward and back, either motorized or activated by the person's weight. There were also stairs that moved up and down, tipped from side to side, or slid side-to-side, alternating directions between steps. 
Compressed air jets shooting air up from the floor, originally designed to blow up women's skirts, but effective at startling almost anyone and making them jump and scream
An array of distorting mirrors.
An extra-large ball pit.

Notwithstanding the images in movies and comic books, fun houses do not drop visitors through trapdoors, which is far too dangerous. One type of floor trick plays on this image: it consists of a section of floor that suddenly drops just a few inches, making victims think they are falling into a trapdoor.

Some fun houses brought new arrivals through a short series of dark corridors or a Mirror Maze or door maze (many identical doors forming squares, only one of which opened in each square), often leading onto a small stage where they had to negotiate a series of rocking floors, air jets and other obstacles, while people already inside the funhouse could watch and laugh at them. A few places even provided benches for the watchers. Once patrons were inside, they could stay as long as they wished, repeating each feature as many times as they chose.

Through the first half of the 20th century most amusement parks had this type of fun house, but its free-form design was its undoing. It was labor-intensive, needing an attendant at almost every device, and when people spent two hours in the fun house, they weren't out on the midway buying tickets to other rides and attractions. Traditional fun houses gave way to walk-throughs, where patrons followed a set path all the way through and emerged back on the midway a few minutes later. These preserved some of the traditional fun house features, including various kinds of moving floors, sometimes a revolving barrel and a small slide. They added such things as crooked rooms, where a combination of tilt and optical illusion made it hard to know which way was up, and dark corridors with various popup and jump out surprises, optical illusions and sound effects.

Although some walkthroughs were given unique names, like Aladdin's Castle (Riverview Park in Chicago), Magic Carpet (Crystal Beach, Ontario) or Riverboat (Palisades Park, New Jersey), many were still labelled Fun House, and regardless of the official name the public generally referred to them that way.

Many traditional fun houses were removed after parks created walk-throughs. Some became dilapidated and were torn down. A few burned down; they were nearly all wood-frame buildings with extensive electrical wiring. Those that remained were all at traditional local amusement parks and died when those parks closed due to competition from new theme parks. No theme park ever created a traditional free-form stay-all-day fun house, but theme parks sometimes developed the walk-through attraction to new, high-tech heights. A few traditional fun houses are still operating in Europe and Australia.

Related, but with somewhat different history, are walk-through haunted houses and mirror mazes, although the latter are sometimes labelled fun houses.

In popular culture

Books
John Barth's experimental short story collection Lost in the Funhouse, and the short story of same title.

Movies
Hollywood sometimes built elaborate funhouse sets with devices never seen in a real funhouse, as in the 1937 Fred Astaire musical, A Damsel in Distress, and the 1939 Joe E. Brown film, Beware Spooks!. Other funhouses depicted onscreen include:

 The silent films It (1927), The Crowd (1928), and Speedy (1928), in which scenes in traditional fun houses can be seen.
At the beginning of Charlie Chaplin's silent movie The Circus (1928), the Tramp is hunted through a funhouse by policemen.
 In the film Pinocchio (1940), Pinocchio and Lampwick visit a funhouse in Pleasure Island.
 In the film noir classic Lady from Shanghai (1947), Orson Welles's famous final shootout takes place in a funhouse hall of mirrors, as O'Hara learns the truth in a place that trades on deception.
 A funhouse is used by the villain Francisco Scaramanga in the James Bond film The Man with the Golden Gun (1974), wherein a series of animatronics, obstacles and illuminated mannequins are used to distract and frighten the victim before the victim is shot by Scaramanga.
 In Grease (1978), the end number, "You're the One That I Want", takes place in a real carnival funhouse built by the Hollingsworth company of Florida. The performers actually move through the funhouse backwards, entering at what should be the exit and emerging at the entrance.
The 1981 horror film The Funhouse is about four teenagers who encounter a serial killer while spending the night in a traveling carnival's "funhouse." The attraction shown in the movie is actually a dark ride.
The horror film Us, directed by Jordan Peele, has a funhouse at a carnival in Santa Cruz, where a young Adelaide runs into her tethered counterpart, Red.
In the 2019 film It Chapter Two, Pennywise kills a boy inside the mirror maze of a funhouse in front of Bill to confront him with his greatest fear.

Music
Funhouse is a 2008 album and song by American singer P!nk.
Fun House is the second studio album by American rock band The Stooges.

Pinball
Williams Electronics designed a funhouse-themed pinball table, FunHouse. Its main attraction is Rudy, the talking head of a ventriloquist's dummy, who taunts players and dares them to shoot the ball into his mouth.

Television
 In "Little Fear of Lightning", the fifth episode of HBO's hit cable TV series Watchmen, a teenage Wade Tillman (interpreted by Tim Blake Nelson) survives Adrain Veidt's 1985 psychic squid attack inside a funhouse at a carnival in Hoboken, New Jersey.
 HBO's hit cable TV series The Sopranos, made numerous references to funhouses and funhouse rides. For example, the episode, "Funhouse", prominently features Palace Amusements' now-empty indoor arcade, wide-eyed clown mural called "Tillie", boardwalk, tower viewer, and Atlantic Ocean view in Tony Soprano's fever-induced dream. Moreover, in another scene in that episode, Tony's mother calls his home for help about stolen airline tickets. Carmela Soprano answers the telephone and remarks as she hands it to Tony: "Here, the fun never stops".
 The children's game show Fun House used a carnival funhouse filled with strange obstacles in its grand prize round. The two members on each day's winning team took turns running through the house to collect tags representing cash and prizes.
 Professional wrestler Bray Wyatt from WWE has a segment on RAW called the Firefly Funhouse based on popular children's show Mister Rogers' Neighborhood.

Video games
 A funhouse is prominently featured in the noir thriller Max Payne 2: The Fall of Max Payne.

Carnival fun houses
Traveling carnivals have long included small walk-through fun houses in addition to their thrill rides. Common features are dark corridors, light-up skulls, gravity-powered tipping floors, and air jets at the exit. Other examples include motorized devices like moving floors and stairways, or downscaled revolving barrels. A few attractions traveling on two or more trailers are more elaborate.

Beginning in the late 1980s, a few American operators acquired European-built attractions that unfold into multi-storied walkthroughs with dozens of tricks. Such funhouses are ubiquitous in Europe, but the falling value of the U.S. dollar and the high cost of fuel to transport multiple trailers over the long distance's carnivals travel in the United States has made them expensive to buy and operate. Due to these factors, fun homes have become few and far between at local fairs and are usually only seen large state fairs.

See also
Mystery Fun House
Obstacle course

References

External links

 Laff In The Dark Information and history of the dark ride and funhouse amusement industry
 The Darkride and Funhouse Enthusiasts (DAFE)

Amusement park attractions